Laurie Davidson may refer to:

Laurie Davidson (yacht designer) (1927–2021),  New Zealand yacht designer
Laurie Davidson (actor) (born 1992), British actor